The Great Western Railway Iron Duke Class 4-2-2 was a class of  broad gauge steam locomotives for express passenger train work.

History
The prototype locomotive, Great Western, was built as a 2-2-2 locomotive in April 1846, but was soon converted to a 4-2-2 arrangement, with the leading wheels set rigidly within the sandwich framing, rather than in a separate bogie. The remainder of the class entered service between April 1847 and July 1855.

Locomotives of the Iron Duke class were fast for their time and were recorded reaching . They were used to haul the Flying Dutchman express train which, for several decades, was the world's fastest train.

From about 1865, the Iron Duke Class was known as the Alma Class.

In May to July 1870, three locomotives (Great Britain, Prometheus and Estaffete) were extensively rebuilt with new frames and boilers, but retaining their original names. Following these, further locomotives were built to similar specifications, entering service between August 1871 and July 1888. These new locomotives are generally referred to as the Rover class. Although these locomotives took the names of withdrawn locomotives of the original design, they were not rebuilt from them like the first three, but entirely new locomotives (though it is believed that Rover, Swallow and Balaklava may have included some parts from the earlier locomotives of those names).

Apart from the three conversions, the original locomotives were withdrawn between December 1870 and June 1884. Lord of the Isles (the last to be withdrawn) was initially preserved by the GWR at Swindon Works, but was scrapped in January 1906 owing to the pressure of space. The three conversions were withdrawn between September 1880 and October 1887, while the other locomotives to the later design were all withdrawn with the end of the GWR  broad gauge in May 1892 (except Hirondelle, which had been withdrawn in December 1890).

Many of the nameplates can be seen at the National Railway Museum and at the Museum of the Great Western Railway, while the driving wheels from Lord of the Isles can also be seen at Swindon.

Locomotives

2-2-2 Great Western

The prototype for this class was named the Great Western and built in 1846.  Named after the railway, it was designed to show how the 2-2-2 express engines could be improved; its  driving wheels were  larger than those of the successful Fire Fly class.  It broke its leading axle after a short while in service and was subsequently rebuilt as a 4-2-2, becoming part of the Iron Duke class.

Iron Duke class

Rover class

Replica 

A working replica of Iron Duke was constructed in 1985 using parts from two Hunslet Austerity tanks for the 'Great Western 150' celebrations. It is part of the National Railway Collection but is currently on long-term loan to the Didcot Railway Centre, which has a section of working broad gauge track. The boiler certificate has expired so it cannot currently be steamed.

The replica appeared in The Railway Series book Thomas and the Great Railway Show, in which it was portrayed with whiskery eyebrows and a walrus moustache.

References

External links 
 

Iron Duke
4-2-2 locomotives
Broad gauge (7 feet) railway locomotives
Railway locomotives introduced in 1846
Railway locomotives introduced in 1871